Ludmila Oliveira da Silva (born April 24, 1995), widely known by her stage name Ludmilla, is a Brazilian singer-songwriter who became known with the song "Fala Mal de Mim" ("She Speaks Ill of Me"). In September 2020, she became the first Black Latin-American female musician to reach 1 billion streams on Spotify.

Early life 
Ludmila was born in Rio de Janeiro, but grew up in Duque de Caxias in the state of Rio de Janeiro. Her former stage name (MC Beyoncé) was inspired by the American singer Beyoncé, which she had to change due to copyright reasons. Ludmilla is considered an emerging female artists in the Brazilian genre.

Career

2012: MC Beyoncé 

Ludmilla began posting videos on YouTube singing, until one day she was asked to sing and rap by a DJ at a party. The performance was well received.

Ludmilla's music career took off after her breakout hit single "Fala Mal de Mim" (released as MC Beyoncé) posted on YouTube went viral. The song was first posted in May 2012 and it has since accumulated more than 17 million views. The official music video was posted in October of the same year and has since accumulated more than 15 million views.

The song was produced by DJ Will 22 and the song's introduction includes a sample of the gospel classic "Oh Happy Day" covered by the St. Francis Choir in the film Sister Act 2: Back in the Habit. Since her rise to fame, she has been touring around Brazil and has made numerous appearances on popular television shows. In an interview with SBT's TV show Domingo Legal, Ludmilla revealed that her former stage name was given to her by her friends because she was such a huge Beyoncé fan.

2013: Name change 
In 2013, Ludmilla said she was threatened by her businessman. The singer recorded a video saying:

Then the singer recorded another video, saying the previous video was a misunderstanding and that she would continue her career. However, the disagreement between her and her manager, Roba Cena, resulted in MC Beyoncé being unable to keep her name as MC Beyoncé because her manager owned the rights to the name. Hours later she recanted and announced on Twitter that she would not quit singing, but she would quit with her manager and start a new career under a new stage name, Ludmilla, her birth name.

However, it is likely the name change was due to potential litigations from the more internationally known singer Beyoncé.

2014–2015: Hoje and First Album 
In early 2014, Ludmilla resumed her career with new look and signed a contract with Warner Music Brazil to release her first album with the label with pop roots and leaving "MC" out of her stage name. In an interview with Radio BEAT98, she explained that many people in the music business are prejudiced when the artist comes with "MC" in the name, even if the music is good.

The new phase includes a decent Star staff. There are 16 professionals, including band, dancers, DJ, a sound technician, plus two personal stylist and two advisers. With tripled cache and a number reaches thirty concerts a month.

On January 14, 2014, the song ''Sem Querer'' was released on iTunes as the first single of his career under his real name. The official music video was released a day later. On June 20, 2014, Ludmilla released the song "Hoje", which was part of the soundtrack of the telenovela Império on Rede Globo, and its respective music video. Ludmilla announced by their social networks to launch the music video of his third single ''Te Ensinei Certin'' composed of single Jhama. The music video premiered on February 10, 2015, in Multishow channel and soon after on YouTube. The video features the direction of John Woo and Rabu Gonzales. On June 1, 2015, it was released the single ''Não Quero Mais''. The music video directed by Rafael Rocha and Lucas Carneiro Neves and was launched on July 13, 2015. The disc version includes the participation of the singer Belo, but for the single release as a solo version was performed. The song ''24 Horas por Dia' was released on October 15, 2015, in Brazilian radio as the fifth single from the album. The music video was released on December 18, 2015, on YouTube, and was directed by Felipe Sassi.

"Hoje" was also the name of her first studio album, which was released on August 26, 2014. The album also included the singles "Sem Querer", "Te Ensinei Certin", "Não Quero Mais" and "24 Horas por Dia".

Discography 

 Hoje (2014)
 A Danada Sou Eu (2016)
 Hello Mundo (2019)
 Numanice #2 (2020)
 VILÃ (2023)

Filmography

Awards and nominations

Tours 
Tour Poder da Preta 
Tour Danada 
Hello Mundo Tour

References

External links 

 
 

1995 births
Living people
21st-century Brazilian singers
21st-century Brazilian women singers
Afro-Brazilian female dancers
Afro-Brazilian women singers
Afro-Brazilian women singer-songwriters
Afro-Brazilian singer-songwriters
Bisexual musicians
Bisexual women
Brazilian female dancers
Brazilian women pop singers
Brazilian women singer-songwriters
Brazilian singer-songwriters
Brazilian LGBT singers
Musicians from Rio de Janeiro (city)
Warner Music Group artists
Writers from Rio de Janeiro (city)
20th-century LGBT people
21st-century LGBT people
Women in Latin music
LGBT people in Latin music
Latin Grammy Award winners